The following real-life inspirational/motivational instructors/mentors have been portrayed in popular films:

W. H. Balgarnie, inspiration for Mr Chipping, in James Hilton's Goodbye, Mr Chips and the three movie (1939, 1969, 2002) adaptations of this classic novella
Stacey Bess, in the 2010 film Beyond the Blackboard
Herman Boone and Bill Yoast, high school football coaches portrayed in the 2000 film Remember The Titans
Sylvia Barrett, new teacher at a New York City high school, portrayed by Sandy Dennis in Up the Down Staircase (1967). Based on the novel of the same name by Bel Kaufman, who taught for 30 years in New York City schools.
Bill Bowerman, track and field coach portrayed in the 1998 film Without Limits
E. R. Braithwaite, British secondary school teacher and visiting professor at Manchester Community College portrayed in the 1967 film To Sir, with Love
Herb Brooks, hockey coach portrayed in the 1981 TV film Miracle on Ice and the 2004 film Miracle
Paul "Bear" Bryant, American football coach portrayed in the 2002 television movie The Junction Boys and the 1984 theatrical feature The Bear.  Bryant is also a minor character in Forrest Gump, in which he coaches the title character during his college years.
 William Carlock in the 2010 biographical film Temple Grandin
Ken Carter, education activist and former high school basketball coach portrayed by Samuel L. Jackson, in the 2005 film Coach Carter
Noel Chestnut, track team coach and prison guard portrayed in the 2008 film Racing for Time
Joe Louis Clark, high school principal credited with the turnaround of a troubled and dangerous New Jersey high school. Joe Clark was portrayed by Morgan Freeman in the 1990 film Lean on Me
Ron Clark, portrayed in the 2006 film The Ron Clark Story
Marva Collins, American educator who in 1975 started Westside Preparatory School in the impoverished Garfield Park neighborhood of Chicago, portrayed in the 1981 docudrama TV movie The Marva Collins Story
Pat Conroy, teacher and later writer portrayed in 1974 film Conrack and 2006 TV movie The Water Is Wide
Sarah Grace Cooke, on whom the character Miss Moffatt was closely modeled in the 1945 film and the 1979 made-for-TV movie The Corn Is Green
Richard Dadier, English teacher portrayed by Glenn Ford in Blackboard Jungle (1955), a film based on Evan Hunter's experience among unruly students at the Bronx Technical High School
William "Red" Dawson, assistant coach of Marshall University Thundering Herd football portrayed in the 2006 film, We Are Marshall
Bill Dellinger, assistant track and field coach portrayed in the 1997 film Prefontaine
Pierre Dulaine, dancer and dance educator portrayed in the documentary films Mad Hot Ballroom and Dancing in Jaffa and in the fictionalized film Take the Lead
Jim Ellis, swimming coach portrayed in the 2007 film Pride
Jaime Escalante, high school math teacher portrayed in the 1988 film Stand and Deliver
Gary Gaines, football coach portrayed in the 2004 film Friday Night Lights
Marilyn Gambrell, parole officer-turned high school teacher portrayed in the 2005 Lifetime movie Fighting the Odds: The Marilyn Gambrell Story
Larry Gelwix, coach of the Highland Rugby team, featured in the 2008 movie Forever Strong
Erin Gruwell, high school teacher portrayed in the film Freedom Writers
Roberta Guaspari, music teacher and violinist portrayed in the 1995 documentary film Small Wonders and 1999 film Music of the Heart
Don Haskins, American collegiate basketball coach portrayed in the 2006 film Glory Road
LouAnne Johnson, teacher and retired United States Marine, portrayed in the film Dangerous Minds
Harold Jones, T.L. Hanna High School, football coach portrayed in the 2003 film Radio
Jack Lengyel, coach of Marshall University Thundering Herd football portrayed in the 2006 film We Are Marshall
Anna Leonowens, teacher and tutor to the children of Mongkut, King of Siam, portrayed in the 1946 film Anna and the King of Siam, a 1956 film and a 1999 film both entitled The King and I, and the 1999 film Anna and the King
George McKenna, educator, teacher, administrator, and superintendent, portrayed by Denzel Washington in the 1986 TV film The George McKenna Story
Jim Morris, high school science teacher and baseball coach who became a major league baseball player after his students encouraged him to try out, portrayed in the 2002 film The Rookie
John Forbes Nash, Jr., mathematics professor at MIT and Princeton portrayed in the 2001 film A Beautiful Mind
Mickey O'Keefe, boxing coach and police sergeant portraying himself in the 2010 film The Fighter
Bruce Pandolfini, chess master who instructed young prodigy Joshua Waitzkin, portrayed in the 1993 film Searching for Bobby Fischer
Sean Porter, Kilpatrick Mustangs coach and corrections officer portrayed in the 2006 film Gridiron Gang
Freida J. Riley, teacher who inspired a love for science and mathematics in her rural West Virginia high school students, particularly future NASA engineer Homer Hickam, in the 1999 film October Sky
Knute Rockne, football coach portrayed in the 1940 film Knute Rockne, All American
Ben Schwartzwalder, football coach portrayed in the 2008 film The Express: The Ernie Davis Story
Catana Starks, former Tennessee State Tigers swim coach, who became the first woman ever to coach a college men's golf team in the 2014 film From the Rough
Iris Stevenson, award-winning choir instructor portrayed in the 1993 film Sister Act 2
Anne Sullivan, teacher and mentor to Helen Keller, a blind and deaf girl, portrayed in the 1962 film The Miracle Worker and remakes in 1979 and 2000
Melvin B. Tolson, debating coach and teacher who was featured in 2007 film, The Great Debaters
Jim Valvano, basketball coach portrayed in the 1996 television movie Never Give Up: The Jimmy V Story
Dick Vermeil, football coach portrayed in the 2006 film Invincible
Jim White, high school cross country coach at McFarland High School portrayed by Kevin Costner in the 2015 film McFarland, USA
Marvin Wood, basketball coach portrayed in the 1986 film Hoosiers as Norman Dale
Ip Man, kung fu grandmaster and teacher, portrayed in the action films Ip Man film series

Film

Teachers